Monostola is a genus of moths of the family Noctuidae.

Species
 Monostola asiatica Alphéraky, 1892
 Monostola infans (Hampson, 1905)
 Monostola pectinata (Alphéraky, 1892)

References
Natural History Museum Lepidoptera genus database
Monostola at funet

Hadeninae